Pandora is the third full-length album by Japanese reggae punk band SiM, released on October 23, 2013. It reached fifth place on the Oricon weekly chart and charted for 13 weeks.

Track listing

Personnel
 Manabu Taniguti (MAH) — vocals
 Masahira Iida (SHOW-HATE) — guitars, keyboards
 Shinya Shinohara (SIN) — bass guitar
 Yuya Taniguchi (GODRi) — drums

References

External links
Discogs. SiM – Pandora

2013 albums
SiM (band) albums